Danilo Ferrari (30 September 1940 – 19 January 2007) was an Italian racing cyclist. He rode in the 1963 Tour de France.

References

External links
 

1940 births
2007 deaths
Italian male cyclists
Place of birth missing
People from Chioggia
Cyclists from the Metropolitan City of Venice